Bengaluru Gundappa Lakshminarayana Swamy (5 February 1916 – 2 November 1980) was an Indian botanist and Kannada writer who was professor, head of the botany department and principal of Presidency College, Chennai. He was the son of D. V. Gundappa, an Indian philosopher and writer in the Kannada language.

Early life and career

Swamy was born in 1916 to D. V. Gundappa and Bhagirathamma. He studied at Central College in Bangalore and obtained his bachelor's degree in botany. After this, and at the suggestion of his father, he began to study the embryology of orchids at home after obtaining a second-hand microscope, a microtome and some basic laboratory tools. He received a PhD from the University of Mysore in 1947 and had a brief post-doctoral period at Harvard University under Irving Widmer Bailey.

From 1953, he served as a professor of botany (and later the principal) at Presidency College, Chennai.

He briefly served as a visiting professor of the botany department at the University of Mysuru during 1979–80.

Notably, D. V. Gundappa and B. G. L. Swamy became the first father-son duo to win the Sahitya Akademi Award. While conferring the award to Dr. Swamy, the then-president of Sahitya Akademi, Umashankar Joshi, described him as "the famous son of a famous father".

B. P. Radhakrishna has authored a book about the life and achievements of Dr. Swamy.

Research

Swamy's primary research area was plant anatomy, particularly the structure of connections between plants' roots and stems. He discovered several plant species, including Ascarina maheshwarii and Sarcandra irvingbaileyi, which he named after two of his teachers. In 1976, he was awarded the Birbal Sahni gold medal by the Government of India for his work in botany.

Writings

Swamy's literary works encompass a wide range of topics. Many of them are related to botany and introduce botanical concepts to the layperson.

Other works by Swamy pertain to literature, and some of them are partially autobiographical, dealing with his experiences as a professor and principal. Apart from being an acclaimed botanist, B. G. L. Swamy was widely respected in the history and literary circles.

He extensively studied and researched the histories and literature of the Kannada and Tamil Languages. His book  (Among the Tamil Heads) is devoted to examining theories pertaining to the language's origins (examining the claims that were being made in those days by the Dravidian parties) and mostly debunking them. In this book, he debunks some of the theories put forward by Tamil linguists and historians such as Iravatham Mahadevan and Nilkanta Shastri. He raised questions regarding gaping holes and contradictions he discovered in their theories.

According to N. K. Ramasheshan, Dr. Swamy authored more than 300 research articles in English, Spanish, German, Latin and French that were published in well-known papers of international repute.

His book  (Green Gold) won him the Kendra Sahitya Academy award given by the Government of India in 1978. With that, Gundappa and Swamy became the first father and son duo to win this prestigious award.

 is a treatise on some familiar and unfamiliar botanical species. It is also a travelogue enlivened by human drama and humor. Students of advanced botany undertake scientific tours in the company of their teachers for the identification and collection of botanical specimens. Swamy was a gifted man of letters with an observant eye, a sense of humour and, at the same time, a deep interest in history and the fine arts such as music, painting and architecture. Thus, as an artist and a scientist, he could explore and explain the world of botany in the light of a wider understanding. He describes the externals of a specimen with vivid precision and technical detail, but his account of the genus and species is only a prelude to a livelier, non-technical account of its appearance, its locations and its practical uses. Sometimes the reader discovers how the specimen claimed attention by appearing in well-known literary works of antiquity.

The book thus unfolds before the reader the abundant riches and the endless variety of the botanical world, as well as the hundreds of ways it helps humans. The human variety and the different characters, all memorably visualized, provide ample scope for portraying dramatic situations of all kinds, from the comic to the romantic. The book primarily deals with the world of plants but it deals also with the world of humans.  is as informative as it is delightful.

Books

 
 
 
 
 
 
 
 
  (incomplete)
 
 
 
 
  (incomplete)
  (translation from Kannada by U. V. Swaminatha Iyer)
  (translation from Kannada by Subrahmanya Bharathi)
  (translation from Kannada by Chetti)
 
 
 

Awards

 Karnataka Sahitya Academy Award for 
 Sahitya Akademi Award for Hasuru Honnu
 Rajyotsava Prashasti by the Government of Karnataka
 Kannada Sahitya Parishat Award
 Birbal Sahni gold medal by the Government of India for his work in botany.

See also
 D. V. Gundappa

References

External links
 Remembering B. G. L. Swamy on Kamat.com

1916 births
University of Mysore alumni
Harvard University people
Kannada-language writers
Writers from Bangalore
1980 deaths
Recipients of the Sahitya Akademi Award in Kannada
20th-century Indian botanists
Scientists from Bangalore
Indian botanical writers
Indian autobiographers
20th-century Indian non-fiction writers
Academic staff of Presidency College, Chennai